The Hylozoists are a Canadian instrumental rock supergroup formed in 2001 in Halifax, Nova Scotia, Canada. The band's name is derived from hylozoism and was started as a side project of record producer and multi-instrumentalist Paul Aucoin.

History
The Hylozoists is an instrumental band conceived by producer Paul Aucoin in 2001.  Aucoin wrote and recorded their first album La Nouvelle Gauche (using a line-up of musicians mainly from Halifax) in his studio in Nova Scotia. The Hylozoists were moved to the back burner as Aucoin had to return to his responsibilities for the band The Sadies.

In 2004 Aucoin moved to Toronto where he revived The Hylozoists.  This conception of The Hylozoists would consist of musicians from other bands such as The Weakerthans, FemBots, and Cuff the Duke.  It was here that Aucoin started fresh and captured the collective sound of his new collaborators, he shed the idea of a “solo project” and created a full-blown supergroup.

The group's third album, L'île de Sept Villes, received a Juno Award nomination in 2010 for Instrumental Album of the Year.

In addition to his work with Hylozoists, Aucoin has also produced albums for other artists, including Cuff the Duke's Sidelines of the City, The Golden Dogs' Big Eye Little Eye and John K. Samson's Provincial.

Music
Their MySpace page describes their music as Indie/Classical/Emotronic.  This is a pretty accurate description of their music, especially considering their instrumentation.  A majority of their instruments (vibes, glockenspiel, organ, violin, viola) are primarily used in classical music, and in some instances jazz.  These instruments interact in conjunction with the other “non-classical" instruments (drums, pedal steel, guitar, bass).  What makes their sound unique is the application of the instruments, not necessarily the instrumentation itself.  While using vibes and a glock is unique for an indie band, what makes it interesting is that some of their songs sound like something out of a feature film.  Aucoin had a musical education (i.e. he had either conservatory tutoring or maybe even post-secondary, classical training) and he uses it in an effective way, not just in writing but also in orchestrating.  In their song "Warning Against Judging", the opening minute is played on glock, organ and a little bit of a guitar - if you were to replace it with strings it would be something from an orchestral movie score.  After the first minute of the song drums and bass come in, as well as violin and trumpet.  It still keeps the feeling of a movie score, something that has been thought out by someone knowledgeable in orchestration.

What is interesting about this band is not only its make up, instrumentation wise, but also its origins and albums.  Technically this band originated in Halifax and then moved to Toronto during its second inception.  Their first album, done in Halifax, was titled La Nouvelle Gauche. Their second album, done in Toronto, was titled La Fin du Monde.

Personnel
 Paul Aucoin(vibraphone, glockenspiel, drums) — founder, also from The Sadies, Cuff the Duke, Hopeful Monster
 Randy Lee (violin)
 Paul Lowman (bass) — from Cuff the Duke
 Greg Millson (drums) — from Gentleman Reg & Great Lake Swimmers
 Christopher Sandes (piano, organ) — from Cuff the Duke
 François Turenne (guitar)
 Eric Woolston (vibraphone, glockenspiel, drums)

Regular touring members
 Patrick Conan (vibraphone, glockenspiel, drums) — from Tricky Woo, Cuff the Duke
 Matthew Faris (drums) — from Cuff the Duke

Past (and part-time touring) members
 Rich Aucoin
 Bryden Baird (horns)
 Jason Ball (organ, vocals) — from Hopeful Monster
 Dave Christensen (woodwinds) — from the Heavy Blinkers, Hopeful Monster
 Peter Conrad (cello)
 Jonina Gibson (viola)
 Rob Gordon (drums)
 Monica Guenter (viola) — from Christine Fellows' band
 Taylor Knox (drums)
 Nathan Lawr (drums) — from Sea Snakes
 Dave MacKinnon (vocals) — from FemBots, Hummer
 Ruth Minnikin (vocals) — from the Heavy Blinkers, The Guthries
 Damian Monyhan (drums) — from Hopeful Monster
 Dale Murray (pedal steel, guitar) — from The Guthries, Hopeful Monster
 Michael Olsen (cello)
 Owen Pallett (violin) — aka "Final Fantasy"
 Lukas Pearse (double bass)
 Julie Penner (violin) — from Broken Social Scene, Do Make Say Think
 Wayne Petti (piano, vocals) — from Cuff the Duke
 Brian Poirier ("weird") — from FemBots, Hummer
 Jeremy Strachan (guitar) — from Rockets Red Glare, Sea Snakes, Hopeful Monster, Feuermusik
 Jason Tait (vibraphone, glockenspiel) — from The Weakerthans, FemBots, Broken Social Scene, Christine Fellows' band
 Leanne Zacharias (cello) — from Christine Fellows' band

Discography
La Nouvelle Gauche (2002)
La Fin du Monde (2006)
L'île de Sept Villes (2009)

See also

Music of Canada
Canadian rock
List of Canadian musicians
List of bands from Canada
:Category:Canadian musical groups

References

Musical groups established in 2001
Musical groups disestablished in 2009
Canadian indie rock groups
Musical groups from Halifax, Nova Scotia
Musical collectives
Rock music supergroups
Canadian instrumental musical groups
2001 establishments in Nova Scotia
2009 disestablishments in Nova Scotia